Clifford Isaacs (born 10 June 1967) is a South African cricket umpire. He stood as one of the umpires in the limited overs series between the South Africa and England women's teams during their series in October 2011.

In South Africa domestic cricket, he has stood in matches in the 2016–17 Sunfoil 3-Day Cup and the 2016–17 CSA Provincial One-Day Challenge tournaments. He is part of Cricket South Africa's umpire panel for first-class matches.

References

External links
 

1967 births
Living people
South African cricket umpires
People from Cradock, Eastern Cape